is the 13th studio album by Japanese singer/songwriter Chisato Moritaka, released on September 9, 1998 by zetima. The album is unique for containing a 22-page photo book and a fold-out poster featuring the same head shot of Moritaka in slightly different angles. It was Moritaka's final studio album prior to her marriage to actor Yōsuke Eguchi on June 3, 1999 and her subsequent retirement from the music industry.

The album reached No. 7 on Oricon's albums chart and sold over 92,000 copies.

Track listing

Personnel 
 Chisato Moritaka – vocals, drums (all tracks)
 Yuichi Takahashi – guitar (1, 4, 6, 10–11), synthesizer programming (2, 4–7, 10), keyboards (11)
 Shin Kōno – keyboards & synthesizer programming (1), Fender Rhodes (7)
 Shin Hashimoto – piano (4, 10–11), Fender Rhodes (4), keyboards (11)
 Yasuaki Maejima – piano (5), Fender Rhodes (5)
 Shunsuke Suzuki – guitar (1–2), ukulele (2), sitar (2), synthesizer programming (2), pedal steel guitar (8), mandolin (8)
 Shikao Suga – guitar (3), bass (3), backing vocals (3)
 Yukio Seto – guitar (4–7, 11), percussion (7), bass (8, 11), wind chimes (8)
 Naoyuki Irie – bass (1)
 Udai Shika – cello (1)
 Masaaki Shigematsu – cello (1)
 Yasuo Maruyama – cello (1)
 Hideyuki Komatsu – bass (2)
 Fumitoshi Nakamura – manipulator (3)
 COIL – all instruments except drums (9)
 Sadayoshi "OK" Okamoto
 Yōsuke Satō

Charts

References

External links 
  (Chisato Moritaka)
  (Up-Front Works)
 
 

1998 albums
Chisato Moritaka albums
Japanese-language albums
Zetima albums